Grisolles may refer to the following places in France:

 Grisolles, Aisne, a commune in the department of Aisne
 Grisolles, Tarn-et-Garonne, a commune in the department of Tarn-et-Garonne